Rhopalomyces is a genus of fungi in the family Helicocephalidaceae. The type species, Rhopalomyces elegans, is a predator of nematode eggs.

Verticillium psalliotae is a parasite of Rhopalomyces.

References

External links

Zygomycota genera
Taxa named by August Carl Joseph Corda
Taxa described in 1839